Karoy Anderson is an English professional footballer who plays as a midfielder for League One club Charlton Athletic.

Career

Charlton Athletic
Coming through the youth system of Charlton Athletic, Anderson signed his first professional contract with the club on 5 October 2021, committing himself until 2024.

He made his professional debut for the club as a 18–year–old, coming off the bench in the 75th minute of a 3–2 EFL Trophy Second Round defeat away at Plymouth Argyle on 22 November 2022 where he scored his side's second goal of the game in the 91st minute of the match.

Aldershot Town (loan)
On 17 January 2023, Anderson joined Aldershot Town on a 28-day loan.

On the same day, Anderson made his league debut for Aldershot Town, coming on in the second half of a 2–1 victory at Solihull Moors.

On 21 February 2023, it was confirmed that Anderson's loan had been extended for a further month.

Career statistics

References

External links
 

Living people
2004 births
English footballers
Association football midfielders
Charlton Athletic F.C. players
Aldershot Town F.C. players
English Football League players
National League (English football) players